Indian School Al Wadi Al Kabir (ISWK), established in 1978, is located in the city of Muscat, Oman. The school was founded by Founded in 1941 as a Gujarati Medium School for the children of the members of the business community. Mr. Lobo was principal of the school since 1990 to spring 2008. Later there was another principal Mr.P.N.Ashok who resigned in 2012. The present principal is Mr. D. Nageswar Rao.

History and background

The school was welcomed its first set of students on 2 July 1978. The school celebrated its Golden Jubilee (50 years) on 1 November 1991. Though originally a Gujarati medium school, in June 1987 the school decided to convert the medium of instruction to English.

Prior to 1993 it was situated at different locations and the growing demand for admission began to strain facilities. It was therefore, decided to shift the school to a larger building that would offer better facilities in terms of a large playground, spacious classrooms, laboratories, a hall and adequate administrative space.

In 1992, it was upgraded to secondary level. An application for a composite affiliation was made in the academic year 1992–93. The rented premises of the school and its future plans for a school building were inspected in November 1992 and the school was granted composite affiliation until Grade X for 1993 (see CBSE letter reference number CBSE/Aff/91/61304, dated 22-12-1992). The first batch of Class X students appeared at the AISS Examination of the CBSE in March 1996. It was upgraded to Senior Secondary School in 1999 and the first batch of Class XII students appeared at the Board examination in 2001.

The current school building was constructed in 1992–93 and occupied in the beginning of the following academic year. As it is located in an area called Al Wadi Al Kabir, Indian School Muttrah as it was called from 1987, was renamed Indian School Al Wadi Al Kabir as per the instructions of the Directorate of the Ministry of Education. This building has science laboratories, IT laboratories, a library, an art room, a music room, a multi-purpose hall with facilities for indoor games, and space for outdoor games.

By the time the school moved to the new premises in Wadi Kabir, the number enrolled had increased and an afternoon shift was introduced on the same premises. However, because the two-shift system was very inconvenient to parents and students, it was abolished and pre-primary and some of the primary classes were shifted to rented premises. At the same time plans were being prepared for a new building in Wadi Kabir, which was ready in July 2000. It houses Kindergarten and Classes I to V. The primary grounds have been extended to accommodate larger crowds for events. In 2008, two more floors were added to the senior school. By 2015-16 every classroom was equipped with smart boards and projectors and in December 2015 construction was started in the senior school to add more class rooms. Pre-primary classes had already been housed in premises very close to the building in 1997. In 2018 elevators were installed in every floor for easy movement of students and teachers.

Academics 
ISWK is a public, co-educational day school that is under the Central Board of Secondary Education of India. The school offers complete educational services starting from Kindergarten through to 12th grade senior school and follows the CBSE syllabus.

Classes 11 and 12 students can choose from two streams of specializations, Commerce or Science . The subjects include accountancy, business studies, mathematics, economics, entrepreneurship, informatics, physical and health education, computer science, biology, physics and chemistry. The school also offers foreign languages such as French, Malayalam, Sanskrit and Arabic for classes 6 to 10(time-stone is used). Second language(Malayalam, French and Hindi) are taught till 10th, whereas Third language(Malayalam, Hindi and Arabic) are taught till 8th.

In 2015, the school won the junior and senior quiz categories at the prestigious Times Of Oman Inter-School Quiz, becoming the first school in Oman to do so.

It has experienced tragedies such as students taking their own life due to academic pressure.

Faculty
To Keep faculty in touch with developments in the field of education, in-house workshops are conducted, and in-service workshops by experts in different subjects are also conducted. Some of these that have been held in the past few years were in Hindi, Mathematics and Social Studies at the Middle and the Secondary level, in Mathematics and Environmental Studies for Primary teachers and on Activity based approach for Kindergarten. Objective-based teaching and evaluation, Value Education in classroom are a few other topics.

Alumni

Some of the notable alumni of the school are:
 Sarah-Jane Dias, Miss India 2007
 Manjari Babu, Indian playback singer 
 Sneha Ullal, Bollywood actress.
 Ali Bin Hussain, American Psycho.

Student council
The school student council consists of all elected members of the student body. The council is led by the Head Boy and the Head Girl, along with the Head Council. Captains are elected for each of the four houses who are in charge of cultural and sports activities that pertain to their house

Here are the posts of the Head Council
 Head Boy & Head Girl
 Deputy Head Boy and Deputy Head Girl
 Cultural Coordinators
 Sports Coordinators
 Public Relations Coordinators

Furthermore, each House Council consists of four ranks , to which a boy and girl each is elected

 Captains
 Deputy Captains
 Vice Captains
 Deputy Vice Captains

References

ISWK Students Finalists at Infinity 2023

Winners of the Times of Oman Quiz 2022

Celebrating Mental Health !

External links 
 Indian School Al Wadi Al Kabir

Educational institutions established in 1978
Indian international schools in Oman
1970s establishments in Oman